W. Paul White (born July 7, 1945 in Cambridge, Massachusetts) is an American politician.

Career

He who was a member of the Massachusetts House of Representatives from 1973 to 1989 from Dorchester, and the Massachusetts Senate from 1989 to 1999. White served as the House Majority Leader in 1984 and the Second Assistant Majority Leader in the Senate from 1995 to 1996.

He resigned from the Senate on October 1, 1997 to become Associate Vice President at Boston College.

Since 2001, he has been a principal at the Karol Group, Inc., a Boston government relations firm.

References

1945 births
Politicians from Boston
Boston College alumni
Suffolk University Law School alumni
Harvard Kennedy School alumni
Living people
Democratic Party members of the Massachusetts House of Representatives